Chitonaster is a genus of echinoderms belonging to the family Goniasteridae.

The species of this genus are found in the coasts of Antarctica.

Species:

Chitonaster cataphractus 
Chitonaster felli 
Chitonaster johannae 
Chitonaster trangae

References

Goniasteridae
Asteroidea genera